Sirdenus is a genus of ground beetles in the family Carabidae. There are about five described species in Sirdenus.

Species
These five species belong to the genus Sirdenus:
 Sirdenus debilis Kryzhanovskij & Mikhailov, 1971  (Turkmenistan)
 Sirdenus filiformis (Dejean, 1828)  (North Africa, Italy)
 Sirdenus grayii (Wollaston, 1862)  (Africa, Asia, Europe)
 Sirdenus pallens Andrewes, 1935  (Pakistan)
 Sirdenus persianus Morvan, 1973  (Iran)

References

Trechinae